The BT Tower is a grade II listed communications tower located in Fitzrovia, London, owned by BT Group. It was also known as the GPO Tower and the  Post Office Tower. It was later officially renamed the Telecom Tower.

Upon completion in 1964, it overtook the Millbank Tower to become the tallest structure in London until 1980, when it in turn was overtaken by the NatWest Tower.

History

20th century

Commissioning and construction
The tower was commissioned by the General Post Office (GPO). Its primary purpose was to support the microwave aerials then used to carry telecommunications traffic from London to the rest of the country, as part of the General Post Office microwave network.

It replaced a much shorter steel lattice tower which had been built on the roof of the neighbouring Museum telephone exchange in the late 1940s to provide a television link between London and Birmingham. The taller structure was required to protect the radio links' "line of sight" against some of the tall buildings in London then in the planning stage. These links were routed via other GPO microwave stations at Harrow Weald, Bagshot, Kelvedon Hatch and Fairseat, and to places like the London Air Traffic Control Centre at West Drayton.

The tower was designed by the architects of the Ministry of Public Building and Works: the chief architects were Eric Bedford and G. R. Yeats. Typical for its time, the building is concrete clad in glass. Initially, the first 16 floors were for technical equipment and power. Above that was a  section for the microwave aerials, and above that were six floors of suites, kitchens, technical equipment, a revolving restaurant, and finally a cantilevered steel lattice tower. To prevent heat build-up, the glass cladding was of a special tint. The construction cost was £2.5 million.

Construction began in June 1961; owing to the building's height and its having a tower crane jib across the top virtually throughout the whole construction period, it gradually became a very prominent landmark that could be seen from almost anywhere in London. A question was raised in Parliament in August 1963 about the crane. Reginald Bennett MP asked the Minister of Public Buildings and Works, Geoffrey Rippon, how, when the crane on the top of the new Tower had fulfilled its purpose, he proposed to remove it. Rippon replied: "This is a matter for the contractors. The problem does not have to be solved for about a year but there appears to be no danger of the crane having to be left in situ."

The tower was topped out on 15 July 1964, and officially opened by the then Prime Minister Harold Wilson on 8 October 1965. The main contractor was Peter Lind & Company.

Opening and use
The tower was officially opened to the public on 19 May 1966, by Postmaster General Tony Benn (then known as Anthony Wedgwood Benn) and Billy Butlin, with HM Queen Elizabeth II visiting on 17 May 1966.

As well as the communications equipment and office space, there were viewing galleries, a souvenir shop and a rotating restaurant on the 34th floor; this was called The Top of the Tower, and operated by Butlins. It made one revolution every 23 minutes.

In its first year the Tower hosted just under one million visitors and over 100,000 diners ate in the restaurant.

1971 bombing
Responsibility for the bomb was claimed by members of the Angry Brigade, a far-left anarchist collective. A call was also made by a person claiming to be the Kilburn Battalion of the IRA. That act resulted in the tower being largely closed to the general public.

The restaurant was closed to the public for security reasons a matter of months after the bombing in 1971. In 1980, Butlins' lease expired. Public access to the building ceased in 1981.

The tower is sometimes used for corporate events, such as a children's Christmas party in December, Children in Need, and other special events; even though it is closed, the tower retains its revolving floor, providing a full panorama over London and the surrounding area.

Races up the tower
The first documented race up the tower's stairs was on 18 April 1968, between University College London and Edinburgh University; it was won by an Edinburgh runner in 4 minutes, 46 seconds.

In 1969, eight university teams competed, with John Pearson from Manchester University winning in a time of 5 minutes, 6 seconds.

Secrecy

Due to its importance to the national communications network, information about the tower was designated an official secret. In 1978, the journalist Duncan Campbell was tried for collecting information about secret locations, and during the trial the judge ordered that the sites could not be identified by name; the tower could only be referred to as 'Location 23'.

However, this is incorrect; the 1:25,000 (published 1971) and 1:10,000 (published 1981) Ordnance Survey maps show the tower. It is also shown in the London A–Z street atlas from 1984.

In February 1993, the MP Kate Hoey used the tower as an example of trivial information being kept officially secret, and joked that she hoped parliamentary privilege allowed her to confirm that the tower existed and to state its street address.

21st century
The tower is still in use, and is the site of a major UK communications hub. Microwave links have been replaced by subterranean optical fibre links for most mainstream purposes, but the former are still in use at the tower. The second floor of the base of the tower contains the TV Network Switching Centre which carries broadcasting traffic and relays signals between television broadcasters, production companies, advertisers, international satellite services and uplink companies. The outside broadcast control is located above the former revolving restaurant, with the kitchens on floor 35.

A renovation in the early 2000s introduced a 360° coloured lighting display at the top of the tower. Seven colours were programmed to vary constantly at night and intended to appear as a rotating globe to reflect BT's "connected world" corporate styling. The coloured lights give the tower a conspicuous presence on the London skyline at night. In October 2009, a 360° full-colour LED-based display system was installed at the top of the tower, to replace the previous colour projection system. The new display, referred to by BT as the "Information Band", is wrapped around the 36th and 37th floors of the tower,  up, and comprises 529,750 LEDs arranged in 177 vertical strips, spaced around the tower. The display is switched off at 10.30pm each day. On 31 October 2009, the screen began displaying a countdown of the number of days until the start of the London Olympics in 2012. In April 2019, the display spent almost a day displaying a Windows 7 error message.

In October 2009, The Times reported that the rotating restaurant would be reopened in time for the 2012 London Olympics. However, in December 2010, it was further announced that the plans to reopen had now been "quietly dropped", with no explanation of the decision. For the tower's 50th anniversary, the 34th floor was opened for three days from 3 to 5 October 2015 to 2,400 winners of a lottery.

The BT Tower was given Grade II listed building status in 2003. Several of the defunct antennae attached to the building could not be removed unless the appropriate listed building consent was granted, for they were protected by this listing. Permission for the removal of the defunct antennae was approved in 2011 on safety grounds, for they were in a bad state of repair and the fixings were no longer secure. The last of the antennas was removed in December 2011, leaving the core of the tower visible.

Entry to the building is by two high-speed lifts, which travel at a top speed of 1400 feet per minute and reach the top of the building in under 30 seconds. An Act of Parliament was passed to vary fire regulations, allowing the building to be evacuated by using the lifts – unlike other buildings of the time.

In 2006, the tower began to be used for short-term air-quality observations by the UK Centre for Ecology & Hydrology and this has continued in a more permanent form as BT Tower Observatory, an urban atmospheric pollution observatory to help monitor air quality in the capital. The aim is to measure pollutant levels above ground level to determine their source. One area of investigation is the long-range transport of fine particles from outside the city.

In popular culture

The tower has appeared in various novels, films, and television shows including Smashing Time, The Bourne Ultimatum, Doctor Who, V for Vendetta, and Danger Mouse. It is toppled by a giant kitten in the 1971 The Goodies episode "Kitten Kong", a parody of King Kong.

Gallery

See also

 List of masts
 List of tallest buildings and structures in Great Britain
 List of towers
 List of tallest buildings and structures in London
 Telecommunications towers in the UK
 Telecom infrastructure sharing

References

External links

 
 . Retrieved on 21 January 2015.
 
 Post Office Tower
 The official tower guide, archive film footage, and more.
 
 
 320 gigapixel panoramic view
 "Thirty-six Views of a London Tower..." A short film with the BT Tower in every shot.
 BT Tower building information & photos

British Telecom buildings and structures
BT Group
Butlins
Communication towers in the United Kingdom
Fitzrovia
General Post Office
Grade II listed buildings in the London Borough of Camden
Observation towers in the United Kingdom
Radio masts and towers in Europe
Skyscraper office buildings in London
Skyscrapers in the London Borough of Camden
Towers completed in 1964
Towers in London
Towers with revolving restaurants
Tourist attractions in the London Borough of Camden